Moechotypa formosana is a species of beetle in the family Cerambycidae. It was described by Pic in 1917. It is known from Taiwan.

References

formosana
Beetles described in 1917